The 2011 All-Ireland Minor Football Championship (known for sponsorship reasons as the ESB Minor Football Championship) was the premier "knockout" competition for under-18 competitors of the game of Gaelic football played in Ireland. The games were organised by the Gaelic Athletic Association. The 2011 series of games kicked off on the 13 April with the majority of the games played during the summer months. The All-Ireland Minor Football Final took place on the 18 September in Croke Park, Dublin, preceding the All-Ireland Senior Football Final. Tipperary won the competition for the second time and the first time since 1934 after a 3-9 to 1-14 win against Dublin.

Leinster Minor Football Championship

First round

Losers Group

Quarter-finals

Semi-finals

Final

Connacht Minor Football Championship

Quarter-finals

Semi-finals

Final

Munster Minor Football Championship

Quarter-finals

Play-offs

Semi-finals

Final

Ulster Minor Football Championship

First round

Quarter-finals

Semi-finals

Final

All-Ireland Series

Quarter-finals

Semi-finals

Final

Championship statistics

Scoring

Widest winning margin: 38 points
Wexford 7-17 - 0-00 Kilkenny (Round 1 Leinster Football Championship)
Most goals in a match: 8
Armagh 3-11 - 5-04 Down (Ulster Quarter Final)
Most points in a match: 35
Dublin 1-24 - 0-11 Kildare (Leinster Semi Final)
Most goals by one team in a match: 7
Wexford 7-17 - 0-00 Kilkenny (Round 1 Leinster Football Championship)
Most goals scored by a losing team: 5
Armagh 3-11 - 5-04 Down (Ulster Quarter Final)
Most points by one team in a match: 24
Dublin 1-24 - 0-11 Kildare (Leinster Semi Final)
Most points scored by a losing team: 18
Roscommon 1-16 - 0-18 Armagh (All-Ireland Quarter Final)

Top scorers

* Where the total points are the same, players are ordered according to total scores. e.g. 2-19 is equal to 21 scores

See also
 All-Ireland Senior Football Championship 2011

References

External links
Leinster Fixtures
Connacht Fixtures
Munster Fixtures
Ulster Fixtures
All-Ireland Series Fixtures

All-Ireland Minor Football Championship
All-Ireland Minor Football Championship